The history of chocolate in Spain is part of the culinary history of Spain as understood since the 16th century, when the colonisation of the Americas began and the cocoa plant was discovered in regions of Mesoamerica, until the present. After the conquest of the Aztec Empire, cocoa as a commodity travelled by boat from the port of New Spain to the Spanish coast. The first such voyage to Europe occurred at an unknown date in the 1520s. However it was only in the 17th century that regular trade began from the port of Veracruz, opening a maritime trade route that would supply the new demand from Spain, and later from other European countries.

In contrast to other new culinary ingredients brought from the Americas, the acceptance and growth in popularity of chocolate in Spain was rapid, reaching its peak at the end of the 16th century. Although chocolate was not immediately adopted by other European societies, it eventually made its way to becoming a high commodity. Once the Europeans realised the societal value of chocolate, they started to incorporate it more into their diet.

From the early stages, the cocoa was sweetened with sugar cane, which the Spanish were the first to popularise in Europe. In pre-Columbus America chocolate was flavoured with peppers and was a mixture of both bitter and spicy flavours. This made it an acquired taste and limited its appeal to the Spanish conquistadors, who were soon encouraged to sweeten it with sugar brought from the Iberian Peninsula in addition to heating it.

Over a 100-year period since its first appearance in the ports of Andalusia, chocolate became popular as a drink in Spain, where it was served to the Spanish monarchy. However, for a time the formula was unknown in the rest of Europe. Later, chocolate spread from Spain to the rest of Europe, with the first countries to adopt it being Italy and France.

The great popularity of the drink in Spanish society from that time until the 19th century is attested to in various reports written by travellers who visited the Iberian peninsula. It was said that "chocolate is to the Spanish what tea is to the English". In this way chocolate was converted into a national symbol. The unusual fondness for this drink meant that coffee remained relatively unpopular in Spain compared to other European countries.

In Spain, chocolate was exclusively considered a refreshing drink, and it was rarely used in other ways—though there are older Spanish dishes that use cocoa. After the Spanish Civil War the custom declined in favour of coffee consumption. In modern Spain, traces of the history of the drink can be seen in the chocolate companies, the chocolate shops and museums. The Spanish also mixed their sugared chocolate drink with milk, just as coffee is mixed with milk. Other ways the Spanish served chocolate was in its natural candy (dulce) drop or “cluster” form which is naturally occurring due to its high cocoa butter content.

Pre-Columbian era 

The Mesoamerican origin of the cacao tree (to which Linnaeus gave the scientific name Theobroma cacao in 1753) is disputed by modern botanical historians since there are different hypotheses about the region from which it comes. Thus, some theories point to the Amazon region; however, it is estimated that the plant also grew in the wild in other parts of Americas, including the plains of the Orinoco Basin. It is very likely that the Olmecs knew the cacao plant, in 1000 BC and transmit its use and cultivation to the Mayans, who were the first to describe cocoa in their hieroglyphics. There is some link between the blood of human sacrifice and the intake of cocoa, and samples found in Mayan tombs strongly imply that the drink was common in the noble classes. The role played in religious ceremonies was explained by Diego de Landa, in his book List of Yucatan things.

As currency 
The chronicles of the Spanish conquistadors contain numerous mentions of its use by the Aztecs as a form of currency, which used the Aztec vigesimal system the use of which was widespread. There were specific names, such as the countles consisting of four cocoa beans, the xiquipil consisting of twenty countles and the "burden," which included three xiquipiles. In his Historia general y natural de las Indias (1535, expanded in 1851 from his previously unpublished papers), Gonzalo Fernández de Oviedo y Valdés noted:

Cocoa was also valued in other contexts such as religious rituals, marital rituals or as medicine (alone or mixed with other plants) as well as being a nutritious food. The widely held belief that it was "a gift from the gods" gave it appeal in pre-Columbian societies as a symbol of economic well-being. Its use as a currency was mostly in the payment of taxes to the powerful.

The age of discovery 

The discovery of new foods or preparation methods went through several stages of understanding. Firstly cocoa was understood as a food and later as a pleasant taste. The latter was only possible through adapting the food to flavours previously known. It is in these first encounters of the Spanish conquistadors with cocoa that we can see that the preparation stage was adapted, it was sweetened and flavoured with other spices such as cinnamon and served warm. After that they had a better understanding of the value of chocolate. Those three simple changes distinguished the chocolate consumed by the Spanish colonisers from the chocolate consumed by the natives. The same pattern occurs in other foods enjoyed at the time by the natives and Spanish. although none of those had an acceptance and a global demand in proportion similar to that of chocolate.

Columbus' first encounter 

The navigator Christopher Columbus, with the economic backing of the Catholic Monarchs, first reached the shores of the New World on 12 October 1492, initially believing that he had reached India. This voyage was carried out to expand markets by establishing new trade routes and therefore rival the Portuguese Empire, which was already well established in Asia. Following the success of that first voyage to the New World, others were organised with the intention of exploring and creating new trade routes. On his fourth voyage, Columbus, in 1502, met an unexpected storm and was forced to temporarily land on 15 August on the Bay Islands. In their first explorations of the area, Columbus' group came upon a boat of Mayan origin travelling from the Yucatán Peninsula. The Spaniards were surprised by the large size of the vessel. Columbus detained the vessel and examined the cargo, which contained cocoa beans that he called almonds in his diary. However, he did not attach importance to these, and after this original inspection he let the boat proceed with its cargo.

In the later period from 1517 to 1519, the Spanish conquistadors Bernal Díaz del Castillo (who referred to the use of cocoa by Aztecs in his book Historia verdadera de la conquista de la Nueva España) and Hernán Cortés both tried the drink and found it to have both bitter and spicy tastes due to the use of achiote. On occasions cornmeal and hallucinogenic mushrooms were also added to the drink. Thereafter the Spaniards knew that cocoa beans were considered legal tender by the locals. Fray Toribio de Benavente (nicknamed Motolinía) mentioned the existence of cocoa in his works such as Memorias or Libro de Cosas de la Nueva España o de los naturales de ella.

Encounters in New Spain 
After the conquest of Mexico, the Aztec emperor, Montezuma, offered Hernán Cortés and his companions fifty jars of foaming chocolate. According to the account of Francisco Cervantes de Salazar, the great emperor had a stockpile of several thousand 'charges' (tens of thousands of cocoa "kernels").

The Italian Girolamo Benzoni in his book La Historia del Mondo Nuovo (1565) wrote that "...chocolate seemed more like a drink for pigs than a drink to be consumed by humans," noting that he had never tasted it despite residing there for over a year. José de Acosta also disparaged the drink, comparing the frothy foam capping chocolate to feces. Despite these caveats, Gonzalo Fernández de Oviedo y Valdés characterised it as an interesting ingredient, while showing some reluctance to describe how some Indians, after drinking it, had stained their lips as if they had ingested human blood.

The perceptions of the Spaniards were changing, in part, due to their increasing reliance on native ingredients. The tortillas made with cornmeal or (tamales), heated without the use of fat did not appear to satisfy the tastes of the conquerors used to pork and culinary techniques based on frying in fat, or sauteed with liberal use of olive oil or bacon. Foods popular in Spain at the time such as cheese were unknown to the inhabitants of the New World.

As the Spanish settlers began to run out the stocks they brought with them, they had to find substitute foods. They therefore began to plant vegetables, such as chickpeas, cereals such as wheat and fruits like oranges or pears. Additionally they introduced the cultivation of olives, grapes and sugar cane. The latter ingredient became important.  From the end of the 16th century onwards, sugar cane began to be added to the cocoa paste, which led to greater acceptance of cocoa among the Spanish settlers.

During this settling in period, around the 1520s, the Spaniards had to get used to new foods and flavours while they attempted to adapt old world cultivation methods to the new climate. Equally, however, the new ingredients brought by the Spanish settlers such as wheat and chickpeas struggled to find acceptance among the native populations who preferred their own homegrown dishes.

Those Spaniards from humble economic backgrounds often married richer Aztecs, often as concubines. Thus, they tended to eat food influenced by Aztec gastronomy. This hastened the spread of cocoa among both cultures. Bernal Díaz del Castillo mentioned that in a banquet held at the Plaza Grande in Mexico (built on the ruins of the Aztec capital) to celebrate peace between Carlos I of Spain and Francis I of France chocolate was served in golden tablets. The wide acceptance of cocoa by the Spanish conquistadors, especially the women, was also described by the Jesuit José de Acosta in his book Historia natural y moral de las Indias (published in 1590).

Spanish acceptance of chocolate came about due to modifications made to the drink. For example, sugar was added, mirroring the native Mexican and Mayan practice of adding honey to cacao beverages. New World spices were replaced with similar Old World spices, in part for the sake of familiarity, but also out of practicality. The Madrid physician Colmenero de Ledesma recommended substituting the rose of Alexandria for mecaxochitl flower blossoms and black pepper for Mexican chilies, when necessary. Cacao beverages containing maize, such as atole, gradually phased out due to the fact that maize-less chocolate lasted longer, making it more suitable for cross-Atlantic trips. While these changes sought only to approximate the existing flavors of chocolate, in turn internalizing Mesoamerican tastes in the Spanish, they were significant enough to break down their initial aversion to cocoa.

As a result, after the initial aversion to cocoa had disappeared, supplies were sent to Spain. The second major transformation of chocolate at the hands of the Spanish was in the serving method: the cocoa was heated until it became a liquid. This was in contrast to the natives of the New World, who generally drank it cold or at room temperature. The third change was the addition of spices from the Old World like cinnamon, ground black pepper or aniseed.

Naming the new product 

The Aztec language, Nahuatl, was difficult for the Spanish troops stationed in Mexico to pronounce. While there was substantial overlap between the phonologies of Classical Nahuatl and the Early Modern Spanish spoken by the conquistadores, Nahuatl phonotactics and grammar were quite different. Moreover, one of the few phonological differences, the presence of the phoneme /tɬ/ in Nahuatl and usually written "tl", caused great difficulty because the suffix "-tl" indicated the common lemma form for Nahuatl nouns. Spaniards commonly reduced the "-tl" suffix to /te/, written "te". Hernán Cortés'  difficulties with the language was evident in the letters he sent, where he writes "Temistitan" instead of Tenochtitlan and the tribal god Huitzilopochtli as "Huichilobos." Coexistence between the two cultures led to the Spanish language borrowing certain Mesoamerican phrases or words such as coyote or maiz.

Many dictionaries suggest that the word chocolate comes from the Nahuatl chocolatl, based on an evolution from -tl to -te; however, there are problems with this hypothesis. Firstly, Coe argues that the word chocolatl does not appear in Aztec cultural writings of the time. Similarly, the word is not found in the work of Alonso de Molina, a lexicographer of the time, who wrote a book about the grammar of the Aztec language in 1555. It is also absent from Bernardino de Sahagún's encyclopedia and from the Huehuetlatolli ("The words of the ancients"), a guide to moral conduct. In all these works, the word cacahuatl (cocoa water) is used. In his periodic letters, Hernán Cortés refers to 'cocoa.' At an indeterminate time in the 16th century, the Spanish of New Spain began to use the word chocolatl.

The Royal Family's physician Francisco Hernández de Córdoba already knew this name in the 1570s, describing chocolatl as a drink consisting of cocoa beans and pochotl, a type of tree seed, both ground to powder. José de Acosta and his contemporaries also used the name chocolatl in Nueva España and the Yucatán making the word a neologism. But others have suggested that the word chocolatl came from xocoatl, where xoco means bitter and atl means water. Another possible explanation comes from the colonial habit of making hot cocoa, with many Mayan dictionaries of the time explaining that "the drink called chocolate" comes from chacau haa (literally 'hot water') which is phonetically close to chocolatl.

First deliveries to Spain 
In 1520 the caravels began delivering Spanish cacao to Spain and the pirates with a letter of marque from England, perhaps due to ignorance of the new ingredient, burned and discarded the contents of the Spanish ships which they seized. No one knows for certain when cocoa first arrived in Spain, however it was considered a valuable material in the mid-16th century. The value which the product had can be seen in the strength of the Spanish galleons which carried the first cacao seeds to Spanish ports to prevent their theft.

There is no evidence that Hernán Cortés  himself brought any cacao back to Spain on his return trip, as when he met Carlos I, King of Spain and Holy Roman Emperor in 1528, cacao was not listed among the gifts brought back from the New World. The first deliveries to Spain were made by small galleys, which took advantage of the "Chocolate wind", as the favourable North wind in the Gulf of Mexico was known.

The first documentary evidence of chocolate in Spain comes from a delegation of Dominican friars led by Fray Bartolomé de las Casas, who travelled to the Iberian Peninsula in 1544 to visit Prince Philip, future Emperor Philip II. During the meeting, gifts of sweetgum, corn, and cocoa are documented. It also refers to a chocolate milkshake that was served, this being the first documented case of the presence of chocolate in Spain. The Dominican friars' familiarity with this type of food may have facilitated the transmission of cocoa from the monasteries of Mesoamerica to Spain. Studies show that, prior to the reception, Father Aguilar would be the first in Spain to prepare jars of chocolate for the Abbot of the Piedra Monastery, Don Antonio de Alvaro.

Other authors refer to the Benedictine monks as the first importers of chocolate in 1532. The first deliveries were brought by the Maria del Mar galley through the port of Cadiz and were delivered to the Convent of the Third Franciscans of Seville. A quote from the Benedictines of the time was: "Do not drink the cocoa, anyone but friar, sir or brave soldier." In 1585, an embassy of Japan, visiting the Emperor Philip II in Alicante, was impressed by the offer of chocolate made by the nearby convent of the Poor Clares of Veronica. From the beginning, Spanish priests were the chocolate experts who spread their recipe among congregations. In 1601, the confessor of the court in the city of Cordoba, Serven Serrietz, inserted small amounts of chocolate in vegetables.

He attempted to plant cocoa in the Iberian Peninsula but the result was a complete failure, leading to the realisation that cultivation was best in latitudes between 20 degrees north and 20 degrees south. The expansion and the need to seek a favorable climate for growing new food meant that cocoa trees flourished in Fernando Poo (in Spanish Guinea) and from there spread across the African continent. At that time preparation of sweets and confectionery was largely in the hands of pharmacists who used chocolate in various secret recipes and pharmaceutical applications. The nutritional use of chocolate was debated in those early times, and possible medicinal uses of cocoa were investigated from the beginning: an example can be found in the Badianus Codex, written in 1552.

Chocolate and confectionery was served in Madrid in the 17th century, and locals in those establishments asked for the "drink that came from the Indies.' Reference to the public availability of chocolate is made by several visitors in the 18th century. In 1680 cocoa was served in combination with melted ice to the nobles present at the auto-da-fés. The writer Marcos Antonio Orellana makes reference to its popularity at the time in a brief rhyme:

The popularity of the drink among noble women was such that, not content with drinking it several times a day, they requested drinking it in church as well. This whim upset the bishops, who published a circular in 1861 banning chocolate consumption in churches during long sermons. Chocolatadas, held at the end of religious services, became popular.

The golden age of chocolate 
By the early seventeenth century drinking chocolate began to be popular in Spain, and was first accepted by the upper classes. It gradually expanded in two directions: geographic and social. Other foods from The Americas were not so accepted in Spanish society of the time as cocoa. The remaining foodstuffs were relegated to botanical study situations, or incorporated in some new culinary preparations on exceptional occasions and with general reluctance.  However, chocolate was part of a number of seventeenth century palace rituals offered to visitors, as part of the "entertainment". This ritual was that the ladies of the Court offered their female visitors a dose of cocoa along with various sweets (cakes, sweetened bread, muffins and brioches) and a vase of snow. The chocolate was served to visitors who rested on cushions, surrounded by tapestries and the heat of braziers heat. Chocolatadas, the social custom of drinking chocolate in the community, had made their first appearance in Spain.

During this century, two factors led to the spread of cocoa. The marriage of Spanish noblewomen to French royalty and the Jesuits providing chocolate recipes in various countries, such as Italy. Demand for cocoa significantly increased in the mid-16th century and the product flowed into Spanish seaports from where it spread to the rest of Europe.

Acceptance by the Spanish ruling classes
New food and drink in this era was usually consumed first by the upper classes, before gradually making their way to the lower classes through imitation. Initially, the austere rulers of the House of Habsburg were not fond of chocolate Hernán Cortés mentioned chocolate to Charles I in his letters from The Americas (the so-called Relationship Letters) and after that, he persuaded the emperor to try it for the first time in the city of Toledo. At the beginning of the 17th century, drinking chocolate was already fully accepted in the royal court, and its consumption was habitual in royal morning receptions. Soon after, chocolate was served in a similar way in all Spanish houses in large cities. The English traveller Ellis Veryard, who travelled through Spain in 1701, wrote about the high reputation that chocolate enjoyed in Spain in his book An Account of Divers Choice Remarks, and described how chocolate was made, painstakingly grinding cocoa in portable stone mills and mixing it with cinnamon, vanilla and a small amount of annatto. In 1644, Antonio Colmenero de Ledesma published one of the first Spanish chocolate recipes which was standard in Spain and Europe at the end of the 16th century. Colmenero self-translated his work to English and it spread through Europe. Spanish doctors who were followers of the theory of the four bodily humours (among them Colmenero) argued that chocolate had a "cold and dry" temperament and produced melancholy. One of the ingredients used in the Colmenero recipe is mecaxochitl (Piper amalgo), a relative of black pepper, and he indicated that, in the absence of this ingredient, Paeonia broteri (a type of rose) could be used.

Spread from Spain to the rest of Europe

The way the chocolate was brought to Spanish ports shows that, during the 17th century, it was one of the most precious commodities brought from overseas. In 1691 an attempt was made to restrict distribution and it soon met with the opposition of the majority of Andalusian merchants. Chocolate was brought to France by the Jesuits and after being promoted by queens of Spanish origin: Anne of Austria (daughter of Philip III of Spain and wife of Louis XIII of France) and Maria Theresa of Spain (daughter of Philip IV of Spain), who moved to France in 1660 to marry Louis XIV of France (the Sun King). As a result, in the 17th century, chocolate became fashionable in Paris. Voltaire quotes this drink in his works in the 18th century.

Sources

References 

Chocolate industry
History of chocolate
Spanish cuisine